Cecelia Nora Isobel Mary Joyce (born 25 July 1983) is an Irish cricketer. A right-handed batter and leg break bowler, she played 57 One-Day Internationals and 43 Twenty20 Internationals for Ireland between 2001 and 2018. She played in her final match for Ireland in November 2018, during the 2018 ICC Women's World Twenty20 tournament. In 2021, Joyce returned to competitive cricket to play for Typhoons in the Women's Super Series after injuries to players in the original squad.

Playing career

Joyce made her ODI debut for Ireland against Australia on 14 July 2001, in the second match of a series. She also played in the third match of the series, and against Scotland in the European Championship. She next played in 2003 IWCC Trophy, held in the Netherlands in July 2003.

The following year, she played three ODIs against New Zealand in Dublin and in 2005, played in the World Cup in South Africa. She also played against Australia and in the European Championship in 2005. She played four ODIs in 2006, two each against India and the Netherlands.

In June 2018, she was named in Ireland's squad for the 2018 ICC Women's World Twenty20 Qualifier tournament. In October 2018, she was named in Ireland's squad for the 2018 ICC Women's World Twenty20 tournament in the West Indies.

Family

Joyce is one of nine children of James "Jimmy" and Maureen Joyce.

Joyce comes from a cricketing family. Her twin sister Isobel has played Test and ODI cricket for Ireland, whilst her three brothers Dominick, Ed and Gus have all played for the Ireland men's team. Ed has also played for England. Her mother Maureen was a cricket scorer. She was also scorer in two WODIs in 2002 when New Zealand women toured to Netherlands and Ireland.

Her sister Helen is Britain Editor at The Economist.

Field hockey
In 2009–10, together with her sister Isobel, Kate McKenna, Emer Lucey and Nicola Evans, Joyce was a member of the Railway Union team that won the Women's Irish Hockey League title.

References

External links
 

Irish women cricketers
Ireland women One Day International cricketers
Ireland women Twenty20 International cricketers
1983 births
Living people
Sportspeople from County Wicklow
Irish twins
Twin sportspeople
Irish women cricket captains
Irish female field hockey players
Women's Irish Hockey League players
Railway Union field hockey players
Cec
Dragons (women's cricket) cricketers
Scorchers (women's cricket) cricketers
Typhoons (women's cricket) cricketers